Henry Riding (19 September 1899 — 21 May 1923) was an English cricketer. He played first-class cricket for Essex in 1921. Riding was born in Epping and died at the age of 23 in Chingford.

Riding's sole first-class match came in a drawn match against Lancashire, in which he scored 23 runs in the two innings in which he played.

Riding was an upper order batsman.

External links
Henry Riding at Cricket Archive 

1899 births
1923 deaths
English cricketers
Essex cricketers
People from Epping